Ahsan Khan (born 9 October 1981) is a British Pakistani actor, producer and TV host. 

He began acting in 1998. He appeared in the films Nikah, Billi, Ghar Kab Aao Gay, Sultanat, Ishq Khuda, Dil Mera Dhadkan Teri and later moved on to television. 

He hosted a quiz show Hayya Allal Falah on Hum TV in 2011, during Ramadan. Ahsan Khan is also hosting 2020's Ramadan transmission which is airing on PTV Home named Ramazan Pakistan.

Early life
He was born in London on 9 October 1981, into a family of five siblings; an elder brother, two elder sisters and a twin brother, who is an author and poet (Yasir Khan) from London. He is the only one to have gone into acting, and when his family moved back to Lahore, he earned a master's degree in English literature at Government College University. According to Khan, his father is half-Pashtun and his mother is Punjabi.

Career
Khan began acting at age 23 when he appeared in the 1998 film Nikah and in the same year appeared in Hans Ki Chaal for PTV. Ahsan later appeared in the films Ghar Kab Aao Gay (2000) and Billi. He then shifted to television appearing in many television dramas throughout the 2000s and 2010s. These dramas include blockbusters like Din Dhallay on PTV and Dastaan on Hum TV.He also appeared in many hit serials with his frequent costar Saba Qamar such as Tera Pyaar Nahi Bhole,Na Kaho Tum Mere Nahi.He also appeared in Mere Qatil Mere Dildar and Kabhi Kabhi with Mehwiah Hayat which were hit serials.He played a rich and handsome businessman in Mausam opposite Hareem Farooq and Yumna Zaidi. He also starred in hit serial Marasim opposite Urwa Hocane and Sonya Hussyn. He also appeared in many serials with Sajal Aly including Gohar e Nayab. He appeared in Kaise Huye Benaam with Neelam Munir for the first time of many serials. He hosted a quiz show Hayya Allal Falah on Hum TV in 2011, during Ramadan. He received acclaim for his role in the 2016 drama Udaari.

Since 2016, he has also turned to production, with the socially relevant series Dukh Sukh, being "tired of the same old 'saas bahu' dramas", and as of 2018, has produced more than twenty works for television.

In 2017, he starred in the romantic-comedy film Chupan Chupai opposite Neelam Muneer. The film was a commercial success. His performance in the film earned him a nomination for Lux Style Award for Best Film Actor.

Khan was appointed as a CLF Goodwill Ambassador by the Children's Literature Festival on 30 July 2019.

In 2019, he played a pivotal role in the acclaimed television series Alif. That same year, he played the eponymous character in comedy series Shahrukh Ki Saliyan, opposite Ramsha Khan.

In 2020, he starred opposite Ushna Shah in the romantic television series Bandhay Aik Dor Say

In 2021 he appeared in a different type of a role in Qayamat opposite Neelam Munir and also appeared in Qissa Meherbano Ka opposite Mawra Hussyn and played a grey shaded character.

In 2022 he is playing the lead role in Meray Humnasheen opposite Hiba Bukhari and is also playing the role of a Fraudster in Fraud opposite Saba Qamar since 11 years though they appeared in Zee-5 short film Momal Rano.

In 2022 he appeared as Kabir in Yasir Nawaz directed Murder mystery Chakkar opposite Neelam Munir.

He also appeared as Danish in Rehbra opposite Ayesha Omar.

Filmography

Films

Television

Reality shows

Music video

Awards and nominations

|-
|-
|2014
|Ishq Khuda
|Best Actor
|
|}

Lux Style Awards

References

External links
 

1981 births
Government College University, Lahore alumni
Living people
British film actors of Pakistani descent
Pakistani game show hosts
20th-century Pakistani male actors
Pakistani male film actors
Pakistani male television actors
Pakistani television hosts
21st-century Pakistani male actors
Pakistani television producers
Pashtun people
PTV Award winners
Punjabi people
Pakistani twins